Haneefah Adam is a Nigerian visual artist, who is known for making art and designs using food items as her medium.

Adams gained prominence in 2015, when she modified Barbie into "Hijarbie", a Barbie doll wearing a hijab. In 2016, she won the #TechMeetArtNG exhibition, which launched her career. Adam's work is inspired by shapes, colours and the histories found in different foods. Adam's skills are sewing, painting and food art.

Adam was born to a Nigerian parent, who resides in Kwara State, Nigeria. She holds a masters degree in pharmacology and drug discovery from Coventry University.

See also 
 List of Nigerian women artists

References 

Living people
Alumni of Coventry University
Nigerian bloggers
Nigerian women bloggers
Nigerian designers
Nigerian women artists
Year of birth missing (living people)